The 2005 NCAA Division I-AA Football Championship Game was a postseason college football game between the Northern Iowa Panthers and the Appalachian State Mountaineers. The game was played on December 16, 2005, at Finley Stadium, home field of the University of Tennessee at Chattanooga. This was the final season that the NCAA football classification now known as the Football Championship Subdivision (FCS) operated as Division I-AA. The culminating game of the 2005 NCAA Division I-AA football season, it was won by Appalachian State, 21–16.

Teams
The participants of the Championship Game were the finalists of the 2005 I-AA Playoffs, which began with a 16-team bracket.

Appalachian State Mountaineers

Appalachian State finished their regular season with an 8–3 record (6–1 in conference). Two of their losses were to Division I-A teams; Kansas and LSU. The Mountaineers were the second-seed in the tournament and defeated Lafayette, Southern Illinois, and Furman to reach the final. This was the first appearance for Appalachian State in a Division I-AA championship game.

Northern Iowa Panthers

Northern Iowa finished their regular season with an 8–3 record (5–2 in conference). One of their losses was to Iowa of Division I-A. The Panthers were unseeded in the tournament; they defeated Eastern Washington, first-seed New Hampshire, and fourth-seed Texas State to reach the final. This was also the first appearance for Northern Iowa in a Division I-AA championship game.

Game summary
Northern Iowa took a 6–0 lead in the first quarter, from a pair of field goals. In the second quarter, Appalachian State briefly went ahead, 7–6, on a five-yard touchdown run by Kevin Richardson.  Northern Iowa then reclaimed the lead on a touchdown of their own, and extended their advantage to 16–7 from another field goal shortly before halftime. In the third quarter, Richardson's second touchdown of the game brought Appalachian State to within two points, 16–14. With just over nine minutes remaining in the fourth quarter, Appalachian State forced a fumble, which was picked up and run in for a touchdown by Jason Hunter. There would be no further scoring, as Appalachian State won their first title via the 21–16 final.

Scoring summary

Game statistics

References

Further reading

External links
 2005 I-AA National Championship - Appalachian State vs. Northern Iowa via YouTube

Championship Game
NCAA Division I Football Championship Games
Appalachian State Mountaineers football games
Northern Iowa Panthers football games
College football in Tennessee
American football competitions in Chattanooga, Tennessee
NCAA Division I-AA Football Championship Game
NCAA Division I-AA Football Championship Game